The 1928 Aberdeen North by-election was held on 16 August 1928. The by-election was held due to the death of the incumbent Labour MP, Frank Herbert Rose. It was won by the Labour candidate William Wedgwood Benn.  The by-election was one of the first British elections where a Communist candidate stood against Labour since Comintern had abandoned its policy of entryism, with the candidacy of Aitken Ferguson, a member of the local Trades Council, who had been the Labour candidate in the 1924 Glasgow Kelvingrove by-election.

References

Aberdeen North by-election
1920s elections in Scotland
Aberdeen North by-election
North, 1928
20th century in Aberdeen
Aberdeen North by-election